The Beeps is a CGI animated pre-school children's television series of 65 x 11-minute episodes. The show was initially broadcast in the UK on Channel 5 Milkshake! segment. Subsequently transmitted worldwide. 
 
The series details the cheerful daily lives and adventures of the Beeps of Beep Island. The show is created by illustrator Malou Bonicos.

The show features several notable actors: Timmy Mallett, Dani Harmer, Daniel Peacock, Ellie Grace, Sadie Wilson, Bob Golding, Tim Whitnall and Tom Baker as the narrator. The show's theme tune and original score are composed by Gareth Cousins. Peter Gosling provided The Beep-Beep Tree Song featured in every episode.

The Beeps initially distributed by Southern Star and subsequently by Endemol Worldwide Distribution to over sixty five countries.

Episodes

 Lost Socks Written by Nick Wilson
  Up High Hill Written by Sadie Wilson
  Beeping in the Rain Written by Adam Peters
  Yuk’s Stuck Truck
  The Sock Mess Monster Written by John and Rosemary Barratt
  Pink Snow
  Hide and Beep Written by John and Rosemary Barratt
  Beep Ball
  Beeping Trumpet Written by John Higgs
  What’s That Noise? Written by Adam Peters
  Sky High Written by Adam Peters
  Flutterbye Written by Adam Peters
  Pet Hospital
  Teeny’s Big Day Written by Helena Smee
  The Big Freeze Written by Adam Peters
  Drozzle Dries Up Written by Adam Peters
  Noisy Neighbour Written by John and Rosemary Barratt
  Sports Day Written by Written by Adam Peters
  Where No Beep Has Gone Before Written by John and Rosemary Barratt
  Bouncy Bouncy Beep Beep Written by Adam Peters
  Big Beep Day
  Yuck Says No Written by Adam Peters
  Wheely Helpful Written by Helena Smee
  Teeny Beep Takes Off Written by John and Rosemary Barratt
  Carnival Written by Helena Smee
  Peas and Beeps Written by Helena Smee
  Stuck on You! Written by Daniel Peacock
  Hole Lot of Trouble Written by Helena Smee
  A Little Adventure Written by Adam Peters
  The Lost Houses Written by Daniel Peacock
  Bounceberry Pie Written by Adam Peters
  Treasure Hunt Written by Daniel Peacock
  Home Sweet Home Written by Daniel Peacock
  Leafy’s Hoe Written by Nick Wilson
   Brand New Bossy Written by Adam Peters
  Twinkleberry Pie Written by Arabella Warner
  The Great Pink Sunset Written by Nick Wilson
  Bubble and Beep! Written by John and Rosemary Barratt
  Put a Sock in It! Written by John and Rosemary Barratt
  Crafty Beeps! Written by Helena Smee
  Cure for Bossy Written by John and Rosemary Barratt
  Hunt the Beep Written by Arabella Warner
  Pets With Pets Written by Daniel Peacock
  Source of the Sapphire Stream Written by Nick Wilson
  Wash Those Socks! Written by Adam Peters
  The Bumps Written by Daniel Peacock
  Up Down Hill Written by Adam Peters
  Caravan Written by Daniel Peacock
  Secret Garden Written by Helena Smee
  Bounceflower Tea Written by Arabella Warner
  The Whale Written by Nick Wilson
  Soggy Sockroaches Written by John and Rosemary Barratt
  Stinkroots Written by Adam Peters
  Sing-a-long-a-Beep Written by Daniel Peacock
  History Book Written by Hannah Williams
  What Goes Splat? Written by Nick Wilson
  Musical Beeps Written by Helena Smee
  Strung Along Written by Adam Peters
  The Sock Tree Written by Arabella Warner
  Beepside the Seaside Written by Sally Marchant
  The Moon-Fruit Tree Written by John Higgs
  No Smoke Without Beeps Written by John and Rosemary Barratt
  Beep Island Blues Written by Helena Smee
  The Bees and the Socks Written by Hannah Williams
  The Rainbow Written by John and Rosemary Barratt

References

External links

Channel 5 (British TV channel) original programming
Television series by Endemol
British children's animated adventure television series
British children's animated comedy television series
2007 British television series debuts
2008 British television series endings
2000s British animated television series
2000s British children's television series
British preschool education television series
Animated preschool education television series
2000s preschool education television series